Andaqui, Andaquí, or Andaki may refer to:
 Andaquí people, an ethnic group of Colombia
 Andaqui language, a language of Colombia

See also 
 Andaqui Terrane, a subdivision of the Chibcha Terrane
 Andoque (disambiguation) (a people and a language of Colombia)